Gladys “Sandy” Dorador Inga (born 4 January 1989) is a Peruvian footballer who plays as a forward for Sporting Cristal and the Peru women's national team.

International career
Dorador represented Peru at the 2006 South American U-20 Women's Championship. At senior level, she played the 2006 South American Women's Football Championship and the 2019 Pan American Games.

International goals
Scores and results list Peru's goal tally first

References

External links

1989 births
Living people
Women's association football forwards
Peruvian women's footballers
Footballers from Lima
Peru women's international footballers
Pan American Games competitors for Peru
Footballers at the 2019 Pan American Games
Sporting Cristal footballers
Peruvian women's futsal players